Lawrence Virgil (born January 20, 1991) is a former American football defensive tackle. He played college football at Valdosta State University and attended Brooks County High School in Quitman, Georgia. He used to be a member of the New Orleans Saints of the National Football League (NFL). Virgil’s NFL career ended due to the tearing of his ACL, MCL, and meniscus in his left knee.

Early years
Virgil played high school football for the Brooks County High School Trojans. He helped the Trojans to a 9-3 record and the round of 16 of the Georgia AA state tournament.

During his college career, Virgil played for the Valdosta State Blazers from 2010 to 2013.

Professional career
Virgil signed with the New Orleans Saints of the NFL on May 12, 2014 after going undrafted in the 2014 NFL Draft. He was released by the Saints on August 30 and signed to the team's practice squad on September 2, 2014. He was promoted to the active roster on November 27, 2014. 

Virgil made his NFL debut on December 28, 2014 against the Tampa Bay Buccaneers. He was waived-injured by the Saints on August 17, 2015. He reverted to injured reserve on August 18. 

He was taken off injured reserve on February 8, 2016 and became a free agent on March 9. Virgil signed with the Saints on June 18, 2016. He was released by the Saints on August 3, 2016, due to his knee injury.

References

External links
NFL Draft Scout

Living people
1991 births
American football defensive tackles
African-American players of American football
Valdosta State Blazers football players
New Orleans Saints players
Players of American football from Georgia (U.S. state)
People from Quitman, Georgia
21st-century African-American sportspeople